The Roman Catholic Diocese of Valence (–Die–Saint-Paul-Trois-Châteaux) (Latin: Dioecesis Valentinensis (–Diensis–Sancti Pauli Tricastinorum); French: Diocèse de Valence (–Die–Saint-Paul-Trois-Châteaux) is a diocese of the Latin Church of the Roman Catholic Church in southern France. The contemporary diocese is co-extensive with the department of Drôme.

The Cathedral of Valence was originally dedicated to Saints Cornelius and Cyprianus (Bishops of Rome and of Carthage, both mid-third century martyrs), but in 1095, during his visit to France to rouse up the aristocracy for a Crusade to liberate the Holy Land,  Pope Urban II rededicated the cathedral to Saint Apollinaris, one of Valence's sixth century bishops. The Cathedral had fourteen Canons, including a Dean, a Provost, the Archdeacon, a Theologian, and the Abbot of S. Felix.

In the Great Western Schism (1378–1417), the Bishops of Valence-et-Die were all appointed by and were loyal to the Popes of the Avignon Obedience.

Pope Pius VI, who had been taken prisoner and deported from Italy by troops of the French Directory, was imprisoned in the fortress of Valence.  After six weeks he died there, on 29 August 1799.  His body was buried in the chapel, and a month later, on First Consul Napoleon's orders, given a public funeral and buried in the town cemetery.

Bishops

To 1000

 Aemilianus (347–374)
 Sextius (374–?)
 Maximus I (400–419)
 Cariatho (c. 442)
 Apollinaris (?–520)
 Gallus (549)
 Maximus II. (567–581)
 Raynoalde (Romuald) (581 and 585)
 Elephas I. (?–641)
 Agilulf (641–?)
 Waldus (?–650)
 Ingildus (Angilde) (ca. 650–658)
 Abbo (678–?)
 Salvius I. (68?)
 Antonius I.
 Bonit (ca. 788)
 Salvius II. (Carolingian)
 Luperosus (Lupicinus) (804–?)
 Antonie II.  ?–?
 Elephas II. ?–?
 Lambert I. (?–835)
 Ado (835–842)
 Dunctrannus ?–?
 Eilard ?–?
 Brokhard ?–?
 Argimbert ?–?
 Agilde (?–858)
 Ratbert (Robert) (858–879)
 Isaak II. (886–889)
 Imericus (?–907)
 Remegarius ( before 909 – after 924)
 Odilbert (947–950)
 Aimon (960–981)
 Guigues (Guy) I. (994–997)
 Lambert II. (997–1001)

1000 to 1300

 Remegaire II. (1001–1016)
 Guigues II. (1016–1025)
 Humbert d´Albon (1028–1030)
 Ponç Adhemar (1031–1056)
 Odo I. (1058–1060)
 Raiginari (1060–1063)
 Gontard (1063–1100)
 Henric I. (1100–1107)
 Eustache (1107–1141)
 Jean I (1141–1146)
 Bernard (1146–1154)
 Odo II.de Crussol (1154–1183)
 Lantelm (1183–1187)
 Falco (1187–1200)
 Humbert de Miribel (1200–1220)
 Gerald of Lausanne (1220–1225)
 Guillaume de Savoie Bishop-elect (9 October 1225 – 4 June 1239) (elected to Liège)
 Bonifatius of Savoy(1239–1242) (elected Archbishop of Canterbury on 1 February 1241)
 Philip of Savoy Administrator (Procurator) (1242–1267)
 Guy III. de Montlaur (1268)
 Bertrand de St. Martin (1268–1272)
 Guy III. de Montlaur (1272–1274) 
( from 1275 to 1678 the diocese was united with the diocese of Dié)
 Amadeus de Roussillon (1274 – 17 September 1281)
 Philippe de Bernusson (1281–1282)
 Henri of Geneva (rejected by the Pope)
 Jean of Geneva, O.S.B. (13 February 1283 – 1297)
 Guillaume del Roussillon (1297–1331)

1300 to 1500

 Adhemar de la Voulte (1331–1336)
 Henri de Villars (1336–1342)
 Pierre de Chastelux (1342–1350)
 Godofred (1350–1354)
 Louis de Villars (1354–1376)
 Guillaume de la Voulte (1 June 1379 – 1383) (appointed by Clement VII of the Avignon Obedience)
 Amadeus de Saluzzo (1383–1389)
 Henri II (1389–1390)
 Jean de Poitiers (1390–1448)
 Louis of Poitiers (26 July 1447 – 26 April 1468)
 Gerard de Crussol (13 May 1468 – 28 August 1472)
 Jacques de Bathernay (1472–1474)
 Antoine de Balzac (1474–1491)
 Jean d'Épinay (16 November 1491 – 3 January 1503)

1500 to 1800

 Cardinal Francisco Lloris y de Borja (1503–1505) Administrator
 Urbain de Miolan (1505)
 Gaspard de Tournon (13 February 1505 – 1520)
 Cardinal Jean de Lorraine (1520–1522)
 Antoine Duprat (1522–1524)
 François-Guillaume de Castelnau de Clermont-Lodève (1524–1531)
 Antoine de Vesc (1531–1537) (then Bishop of Castres)
 Jacques de Tournon (1537–1553) (then Bishop of Castres)
 Jean de Montluc (1553–1579)
 Charles I. de Leberon (1579–1598)
 Pierre-André de Leberon (1598–1621)
 Charles II. de Leberon (1621–1654)
 Daniel de Cosnac (1654–1687)
 Guillaume Bochart de Champigny (1687–1705)
 Jean de Catelan  (1705 Appointed – Jan 1725 Died)
 Alexandre de Milon (1725–1771)
 Pierre-François de Grave (1771–1787)
 Gabriel-Melchior de Messey (1778–1791)
 François Marbos (1791–1795) (constitutional bishop)
 Vacant (1795–1801)

From 1800
François Bécherel (5 Jul 1802 Appointed – 25 Jun 1815 Died)
Marie-Joseph-Antoine-Laurent de la Rivoire de La Tourette (8 Aug 1817 Appointed – 3 Apr 1840 Died)
Pierre Chatrousse (26 May 1840 Appointed – 17 May 1857 Died)
Jean-Paul-François-Marie-Félix Lyonnet (24 Jun 1857 Appointed – 4 Dec 1864) Appointed Archbishop of Albi
Nicolas-Edouard-François Gueullette (9 Dec 1864 Appointed – 7 Jan 1875 Resigned)
Charles-Pierre-François Cotton (16 Jan 1875 Appointed – 25 Sep 1905 Died)
Jean-Victor-Emile Chesnelong (21 Feb 1906 Appointed – 12 Jan 1912 Appointed, Archbishop of Sens (-Auxerre))
Emmanuel-Marie-Joseph-Anthelme Martin de Gibergues (7 Feb 1912 Appointed – 28 Dec 1919 Died)
Désiré-Marie-Joseph-Antelne-Martin Paget (22 Apr 1920 Appointed – 11 Jan 1932 Died)
Camille Pic (16 Aug 1932 Appointed – 25 Nov 1951 Died)
Joseph-Martin Urtasun (10 Aug 1952 Appointed – 17 Sep 1955 Appointed, Coadjutor Archbishop of Avignon)
Charles-Marie-Paul Vignancour (18 Dec 1957 Appointed – 6 Mar 1966 Appointed, Coadjutor Archbishop of Bourges)
Jean-Barthélemy-Marie de Cambourg (6 Mar 1966 Appointed – 1 Dec 1977 Resigned)
Didier-Léon Marchand (8 Sep 1978 Appointed – 11 Dec 2001 Retired)
Jean-Christophe André Robert Lagleize (11 Dec 2001 Appointed – 24 June 2014)
Pierre-Yves Michel (4 Apr 2014 Appointed – present)

References

Books and articles

Reference books
 pp. 648–649. (Use with caution; obsolete)
  pp. 512–513. (in Latin)
 p. 262. (in Latin)
 p. 326 (in Latin)
 p. 357. (in Latin)
 p. 403.
 p. 430.

Studies

 second edition (in French)  pp. 215–225.

External links
 G-Catholic,  Diocese of Valence, retrieved: 2016-08-08.
  David M. Cheney, Catholic-Hierarchy,  ''Diocese of Valence-Die-Saint-Paul-Trois-Châteaux), retrieved: 2016-08-08.

Acknowledgments

 
Roman Catholic dioceses in France